Congregation B'nai Israel is the only Karaite synagogue in the United States.  It is located in Daly City, California. Malcolm Cohen served here for 19 years.

See also
Karaite Judaism

References

External links
Karaite Jews of America

Daly City, California
Egyptian-American culture in California
Karaite synagogues
Religious buildings and structures in San Mateo County, California
Synagogues in California
Egyptian-Jewish culture in the United States